Serder Mukailovich Serderov (born 10 March 1994) is a Russian footballer who plays as a winger for Kazakhstani club Aktobe on loan from Istra 1961.

Career

CSKA Moscow
Serderov was a youth player of the local academy RSDYuShOR-2 Makhachkala, playing for Anzhi Makhachkala youth teams, before moving to CSKA Moscow at the age of 14. In the summer of 2010 Italian champion Juventus wanted to sign the 17-year-old Serderov, but CSKA declined the offer.

On 22 November 2011 he made his professional debut for the team in a match against OSC Lille in the Champions League, coming on as a substitute in the 87th minute of the game.

Anzhi
In the summer of 2012 he moved to Anzhi Makhachkala. He made his debut in the Russian Premier League on 18 November 2012 for FC Anzhi Makhachkala in a game against FC Rostov.

Ural loan
In the June 2013 Serderov joined newly promoted Ural Sverdlovsk Oblast on a season-long loan. The loan was ended on 16 August 2013.

Loan return
He returned in Anzhi after only 4 games with the team, but became a key player for the 2013–14 season after Anzhi budget cuts with a total of 29 matches this season. He made his second debut in the Russian Premier League for Anzhi on 17 August 2013 in a 3:0 loss to Zenit Saint Petersburg. On 17 March 2014 he scored his debut goal in the league for Anzhi in a match against Spartak Moscow where he scored in the 95th minute for the ending 2:2 result.

Krylia Sovetov loan
In February 2015 Serderov moved on loan again, this time to FC Krylia Sovetov Samara until the end of the season. He played in only 2 matches.

His Anzhi contract was dissolved by mutual consent on 28 January 2016.

Slavia Sofia
Serderov joined Bulgarian club Slavia Sofia on 1 February 2016, eventually debuting unofficially for the team in a friendly match against Slovak champions Trenčín during their winter training camp. He made his official debut in the first A Group match after the winter break against Cherno More Varna. He scored his first goal in a 1–0 away win over Botev Plovdiv on 3 March 2016. On 24 April 2016 he received an injury which eventually led him to miss out the rest of the season.

In June 2017, Serderov's contract was terminated by mutual consent.

Yenisey Krasnoyarsk
On 19 July 2017, Serderov signed a two year contract with Yenisey Krasnoyarsk.

Cracovia
On 16 August 2018, Serderov signed a contract with Polish club Cracovia. He left Cracovia by mutual consent on 2 January 2019.

Inter Zaprešić
On 14 January 2019, he joined Croatian club Inter Zaprešić.

Mezőkövesd
On 4 August 2020, he signed a three-year contract with Hungarian club Mezőkövesd.

Career statistics

Club

References

1994 births
Footballers from Makhachkala
Living people
Russian footballers
Association football forwards
Russia youth international footballers
Russia under-21 international footballers
FC Anzhi Makhachkala players
FC Ural Yekaterinburg players
PFC Krylia Sovetov Samara players
PFC Slavia Sofia players
FC Yenisey Krasnoyarsk players
PFC CSKA Moscow players
MKS Cracovia (football) players
NK Inter Zaprešić players
Mezőkövesdi SE footballers
NK Istra 1961 players
FC Aktobe players
Russian Premier League players
Russian First League players
First Professional Football League (Bulgaria) players
Ekstraklasa players
Croatian Football League players
Nemzeti Bajnokság I players
Kazakhstan Premier League players
Russian expatriate footballers
Russian expatriate sportspeople in Bulgaria
Expatriate footballers in Bulgaria
Russian expatriate sportspeople in Poland
Expatriate footballers in Poland
Russian expatriate sportspeople in Croatia
Expatriate footballers in Croatia
Russian expatriate sportspeople in Hungary
Expatriate footballers in Hungary
Russian expatriate sportspeople in Kazakhstan
Expatriate footballers in Kazakhstan